Ashaghy Gushchular or Ghushchular is a village de facto in the Askeran Province of the Republic of Artsakh, de jure in the Shusha District of Azerbaijan.

The village had an Azerbaijani-majority population before the First Nagorno-Karabakh War. During the capture of village the Azerbaijani population was expelled, it was reported 8 civilians were killed.

References

External links 
 

Populated places in Shusha District